Fernando Javier Molina Arredondo (born November 17, 1985 in Lima) is a Peruvian footballer who plays as a fullback. He currently plays for Deportivo Coopsol.

Honours
 Universitario de Deportes:
 Torneo Apertura: 2008

References

External links

1985 births
Living people
Footballers from Lima
Peruvian footballers
Club Universitario de Deportes footballers
José Gálvez FBC footballers
Ayacucho FC footballers
Peruvian Primera División players
Peruvian Segunda División players
Association football fullbacks